Yakov Gdalyevich Pliner (born December 27, 1946, in Rēzekne) is a Latvian politician of Jewish origin and MP of the 7th, 8th and 9th convocations for the union For Human Rights in United Latvia (ForHRUL). He was member of Social Democratic party group in the Baltic Assembly.

Biography
1965–1970 — studied at the Teachers' Institute of Daugavpils, profession – secondary school teacher of biology and chemistry.

1970–1975 — teacher, assistant director, director of the Virbi secondary school (Talsi district).

1975–1983 — worked in the Department of Education of Talsi Executive Committee.

1983–1993 — worked in the Ministry of Education of Latvia.

1993–1998 — founder and director of the "Eureka" (Эврика) private college of general education.

1997 — Pliner received his Dr. paed. degree from the University of Latvia, and was elected to the Riga City Council from National Harmony Party (NHP).

1998 — elected to the 7th Saeima (Parliament).

2002 — elected to the 8th Saeima.

2003 — Pliner left NHP (which had withdrawn from For Human Rights in a United Latvia (ForHRUL) that year) and returned to the union. He became the leader of the newly founded party "Free Choice in People's Europe" (BITE), co-chairman of ForHRUL (until 2015) and chairman of its parliamentary group. One of the leaders of Headquarters for the Protection of Russian Schools, writing several publications on the language of instruction issues.

2006 — before the parliamentary elections, ForHRUL named Pliner its candidate for Prime Minister. Elected to the 9th Saeima, remained chairman of ForHRUL parliamentary group (until 2010).

2020 - elected to the Riga City Council.

References

External links
CV of Pliner on ForHRUL site
Pliner's politics blog  at the newspaper Diena's website

1946 births
Living people
People from Rēzekne
Latvian people of Russian-Jewish descent
National Harmony Party politicians
Latvian Russian Union politicians
Deputies of the 7th Saeima
Deputies of the 8th Saeima
Deputies of the 9th Saeima
University of Latvia alumni
University of Daugavpils alumni